Malaysian Tamil, also known as Malaya Tamil, is a local variant of the Tamil language spoken in Malaysia. It is one of the languages of education in Malaysia, along with English, Malay and Mandarin. There are many differences in vocabulary between Malaysian Tamil and Indian Tamil.

Influence
An element needed to carry out commercial transactions is a common language understood by all parties involved in early trade. Historians such as J.V. Sebastian, K.T. Thirunavukkarasu, and A.W. Hamilton record that Tamil was the common language of commerce in Malaysia and Indonesia during historical times.
The maritime Tamil significance in Sumatran and Malay Peninsula trading continued for centuries and borrowings into Malay from Tamil increased between the 15th and 19th centuries due to their commercial activities. In the 17th century, the Dutch East India Company was obliged to use Tamil as part of its correspondence. In Malacca and other seaports up to the 19th century, Malay terminology pertaining to book-keeping and accountancy was still largely Tamil.

Borrowings into Malay from Tamil (sometimes Sanskritized) include such everyday words as:

References

Sources

 
 
 
 
 
 
 
 
 
 
 
 
 
 
 
 
 
 
 
 
 
 
   (Translated from Tamil by E.Sa. Viswanathan)
 

Tamil dialects
Tamil language
Languages of Malaysia
Penang Tamil
Indian languages in Singapore